Rolfes Robert Reginald Dhlomo (1906–1971) was a South African journalist, novelist and historian born in Siyamu, Edendale in the province of KwaZulu. His novella An African Tragedy, published in 1928, was the first fiction work written by a black South African to appear in book form. Together with his brother Herbert, he worked as a journalist and editor for the journals Bantu World and Ilanga laseNatali. He wrote his later novels in isiZulu.

He wrote five historical novels about Zulu kings, which have been used extensively as school readers on South African history during apartheid, up until now.

His Selected Short Stories was originally published in 1975 by the Institute for the Study of English in Africa. A revised edition was published in South Africa by the Institute for the Study of English in Africa, Rhodes University, in 1996 .

Sources
Chapman, Michael. 2003. Southern African Literatures, University of Natal Press. 

1906 births
1971 deaths
Zulu people
South African writers